João Carlos Di Genio (27 February 1939 – 12 February 2022) was a Brazilian physician and educator. He created and was the main owner of the largest educational holding in the country, comprising the Sistema Objetivo (primary, secondary and preparatory schools) and the Universidade Paulista (UNIP), a private university with more than 60 campuses all over Brazil.

Education and career
Born in Brazil, Di Genio started his educational career while he was a medical student at the University of São Paulo, in São Paulo in the 1960s. The mandatory entrance examination to the medical schools was increasingly tougher for many high school students. The inborn entrepreneurial spirit of di Genio led him to create a one-year preparatory pre-med course, initially in his own home. The success achieved by the course prompted him to establish a formal school, together with three of his colleagues (Drauzio Varella, Tadasi Ito and Roger Patti), which was named Curso Pré-Vestibular Nove de Julho. This later became the Objetivo prep course. Other educational levels were subsequently added.

Death
Di Genio died in São Paulo on 12 February 2022, at the age of 82.

References

External links
 Universidade Paulista
 Sistema Objetivo

1939 births
2022 deaths
Brazilian businesspeople
Brazilian educators
Brazilian people of Italian descent
People from Araçatuba